The 1976 Men's World Outdoor Bowls Championship was held at Zoo Lake Park in Johannesburg, South Africa, from 18 February to 6 March, 1976.

Doug Watson won the singles which was held in a round robin format. South Africa completed a clean sweep of events by taking the pairs, triples and fours Gold which also help them lift the Leonard Trophy.

Medallists

Men's singles

Round-robin results

Final table

Men's pairs

Round-robin results

Final table

Men's triples

Round-robin results

Final table

Men's fours

Round-robin results

Final table

W. M. Leonard Trophy

+ more shots

References

World Outdoor Bowls Championship
World
bowls 
World Outdoor Bowls Championship
World Outdoor Bowls Championship